Ahmadabad (also Romanized as Aḩmadābād; also known as Aḩmadābād-e Bālā) is a village in Baghak Rural District, in the Central District of Tangestan County, Bushehr Province, Iran. At the 2006 census, its population was 431, in 109 families.

References 

Populated places in Tangestan County